is a former Japanese football player and manager. He is the current manager J2 League club of Thespakusatsu Gunma.

Playing career
Otsuki was born in Sendai on December 1, 1972. After graduating from University of Tsukuba, he played for his local club Sony Sendai.

Coaching career
After retiring players career, Otsuki became J.League club coach. (Mito HollyHock (2000-2002), Omiya Ardija (2003), Urawa Reds (2004-2010) and Vegalta Sendai (2011)) In 2012, he returned Urawa Reds. On April 2, 2018, team manager Takafumi Hori was sacked. Otsuki became manager. On April 22, the club contracted with Oswaldo de Oliveira. So, Otsuki became assistant coach. In May 2019, manager Oliveira was sacked and Otsuki became a manager again.

On 16 December 2021, Otsuki announcement officially appointment manager of Thespakusatsu Gunma from 2022 season.

Managerial statistics
.

References

External links

1972 births
Living people
University of Tsukuba alumni
Association football people from Miyagi Prefecture
Japanese footballers
Sony Sendai FC players
Japanese football managers
J1 League managers
J2 League managers
Urawa Red Diamonds managers
Thespakusatsu Gunma managers
Association footballers not categorized by position